Pachysolen may refer to:
 Nolana, or Chilean bell flower, a plant genus also known as Pachysolen 
 Pachysolen (fungus), a genus of yeast including Pachysolen tannophilus